Andrés Barea (ca.1610–1680) was a Spanish composer. He was maestro de capilla at the cathedrals of Osma, Salamanca, Valladolid, and finally Palencia in 1654.

References

1610 births
1680 deaths
17th-century classical composers